The beech argument is a now mostly outdated argument in Indo-European studies that is in favour of placing the Indo-European urheimat in an area west of a line connecting Kaliningrad and the Black Sea, based on the current distribution of beech trees. The argument, as summarised by Friedrich and Mallory goes that the Indo-European term *bʰāg(ó) most probably refers to the beech tree. Hence the presence of descendants of the term *bʰāg(ó) in Italic, Germanic, Albanian, Greek and (Indo-)Iranian, and potentially Celtic, Slavic, and Baltic, indicates that this word belonged to the most widely-spoken Indo-European language. And thirdly that since the beech tree distribution was limited historically to the regions west of the Eurasian Steppe, this is where this language was spoken.

However much like the salmon problem, this is now an outdated argument, based on many factors including that the historical distribution of the beech trees was historically different from that of today, with certain species potentially extending to the Don River or to the Caucasus, due to the beech being climatically sensitive, and that with the exception of the Kurdish buz, these words for beech are only found in Western Indo-European languages.

See also 
 Comparative method (linguistics)
 North European hypothesis
 Salmon problem

References

Fagus
History of the Black Sea
Indo-European linguistics
Indo-European studies
Kaliningrad
Origin hypotheses of ethnic groups
Trees in culture